Cruisin for a Bruisin is the third album by Danish rock band Fate, released in 1988. The album featured "Lovers" (released as a single plus video clip in 1988) and a new version of "Love on the Rox" from the band's debut album. The album was digitally remastered and reissued in 2001.

Track listing 
"Beneath da Coconuts" – 4:34
"Love on the Rox" – 3:35
"Knock on Wood" – 2:59
"Lovers" – 4:15
"Dead Boy, Cold Meat" – 3:26
"Babe, You Got a Friend" – 4:44
"Lock You Up" – 4:26
"Cupid Shot Me" – 3:50
"Diamond in the Rough" – 3:52
"Send a Little Money" – 3:40

Personnel 
Fate
Jeff "Lox" Limbo – vocals
The Mysterious Mr. Moth – guitars
Flemming Rothaus – keyboards
Pete Steiner – bass
Bob Lance – drums

Production
Simon Hanhart – producer
Peter Mark – engineer, assistant engineer
Søren Svendsen – photography

References 

1988 albums
Fate (band) albums
EMI Records albums